Endotricha flavifusalis is a species of snout moth in the genus Endotricha. It is found in China (Hainan), Indonesia, Malaysia and Papua New Guinea.

References

Moths described in 1891
Endotrichini